The East Shoreham Covered Railroad Bridge is a historic covered bridge spanning the Lemon Fair River near East Shoreham, Vermont. Built in 1897 by the Rutland Railroad Company, it is the state's only surviving example of a wooden Howe truss railroad bridge. It was listed on the National Register of Historic Places in 1974.

Description and history

The East Shoreham Bridge is located in a rural area of southeastern Shoreham, on the Lemon Fair River. It is a single-span Howe truss structure,  in length, and set on dry-laid stone abutments faced in concrete. The trusses consist of wooden diagonals and iron rod verticals. The railroad tracks, which have been removed, were original laid directly on the deck timbers. The bridge's exterior consists of vertical board siding covered by a metal roof.

The bridge was built in 1897 by the Rutland Railroad Company for service on its Addison Branch line. Because of the line's relatively light traffic, it was not judged necessary to go to the expense of building an iron bridge, resulting in the construction of one of the state's few surviving 19th-century covered railroad bridges. It remained in service until 1951, when the line was abandoned. The state acquired the bridge and surrounding land in 1972.

See also
List of Vermont covered bridges
List of bridges documented by the Historic American Engineering Record in Vermont
List of bridges on the National Register of Historic Places in Vermont
National Register of Historic Places listings in Addison County, Vermont

References

External links

Railroad bridges on the National Register of Historic Places in Vermont
Historic American Engineering Record in Vermont
National Register of Historic Places in Addison County, Vermont
Bridges completed in 1897
Bridges in Addison County, Vermont
Wooden bridges in Vermont
Covered bridges in Vermont
Buildings and structures in Shoreham, Vermont
Howe truss bridges in the United States
1897 establishments in Vermont